Events from the year 1746 in art.

Events
The Venetian painter Canaletto moves to London, beginning a nine-year stay in England to be closer to his market.
The French philosopher Charles Batteux publishes  Les beaux-arts réduits à un même principe in Paris, putting forward for the first time the idea of les beaux arts, the fine arts.

Paintings

Canaletto
A Most Beautiful View of the City of London Taken Through One of the Centres of the Arches of the New Bridge at Westminster (Alnwick Castle, Northumberland)
Westminster Bridge, with the Lord Mayor's Procession on the Thames (c.1746-47; Yale Center for British Art, New Haven, Connecticut)
Elias Gottlob Haussmann – Johann Sebastian Bach
Thomas Hudson – Theodore Jacobsen
John Smybert – Sir William Pepperrell, Bt
Giovanni Battista Tiepolo - St. Catherine of Siena

Births
 March 9 – François-Nicolas Delaistre, French sculptor (died 1832)
 March 22 – Gerard van Spaendonck, Dutch painter (died 1822)
 March 30 – Francisco Goya, Aragonese Spanish painter and printmaker (died 1828)
 June 6 – Francesco Saverio Mergalo, Italian portrait painter of the Rococo or late-Baroque period (died 1786)
 October 22 – James Northcote, English painter (died 1831)
 November 11 – Jean Guillaume Moitte, French sculptor (died 1810)
 December 30 – François-André Vincent, French painter (died 1816)
 date unknown
 Luis Paret y Alcázar, Spanish painter of the late-Baroque or Rococo period (died 1799)
 Anthonie Andriessen, Dutch landscape painter (died 1813)
 William Ashford, British painter who worked exclusively in Ireland (died 1824)
 Domenico Aspari, Italian painter and engraver (died 1831)
 Etienne Aubry, French painter of primarily portraits and genre subjects (died 1781)
 Ramón Bayeu, Spanish Neoclassicist painter (died 1793)
 John Bogle, Scottish miniature painter (died 1803)
 Joseph Boze, French portrait and miniature painter (died 1826)
 Teodor Ilić Češljar, one of the best late Baroque and Rococo Serbian painters from the region of Vojvodina (died 1793)
 Balthasar Anton Dunker, German landscape painter and etcher (died 1807)
 Mauritius Lowe, British painter and engraver (died 1793)
 Xi Gang, renowned Chinese calligrapher and painter in Qing Dynasty (died 1803)
 Philippe-Laurent Roland, French sculptor (died 1816)
 Michael Angelo Rooker, English oil and watercolour painter, illustrator and engraver (died 1801)
 Henry Walton, British painter and art dealer (died 1813)

Deaths
February 22 – Guillaume Coustou the Elder, French sculptor and academician (born 1677)
March 20 – Nicolas de Largillière, French painter (born 1656)
March 29 – Matteo Ripa, painter, engraver and missionary (born 1682)
June 8 – Giacomo Leoni, architect (born 1686)
July 30 – Francesco Trevisani, Italian painter of frescoes (born 1656)
December 31 – Antonio Baroni, Italian painter active in Verona (born 1678)
date unknown
Domenico Bocciardo, Italian painter, active in Genoa (born 1680)
Jan Baptist Bosschaert, Flemish painter (born 1667)
Sebastiano Galeotti, peripatetic Italian painter (born 1656)
Francesco Antonio Xaverio Grue, Italian potter and painter (born 1686)
Theodor van Pee, Dutch painter (born 1668)

References

 
Years of the 18th century in art
1740s in art